The Fogg Building is a historic commercial building at 100–110 Pleasant Street and 6–10 Columbian Street in Weymouth, Massachusetts.  The -story masonry building was designed by J. Williams Beal, and built in 1887 for local businessman John Fogg.  The Richardsonian Romanesque structure originally housed a performance space and social gathering places in its upper floors; these spaces have been converted to apartments.

The building was listed on the National Register of Historic Places in 1983.

See also
National Register of Historic Places listings in Norfolk County, Massachusetts

References

Event venues on the National Register of Historic Places in Massachusetts
Buildings and structures in Norfolk County, Massachusetts
Weymouth, Massachusetts
National Register of Historic Places in Norfolk County, Massachusetts